This is a list of high schools in the state of Kansas, grouped by county.

Allen County
 Humboldt High School, Humboldt, USD 258
 Iola High School, Iola, USD 257
 Marmaton Valley High School, Moran, USD 256

Anderson County
 Anderson County Jr/Sr High School, Garnett, USD 365
 Crest High School, Colony, USD 479

Atchison County
 Atchison County Community High School, Effingham, USD 377
 Atchison High School, Atchison, USD 409
 Maur Hill - Mount Academy, Atchison, Private

Barber County
 Medicine Lodge High School, Medicine Lodge, USD 254
 South Barber High School, Kiowa, USD 255

Barton County
 Central Plains High School, Claflin, USD 112
 Ellinwood High School, Ellinwood, USD 355
 Great Bend High School, Great Bend, USD 428
 Hoisington High School, Hoisington, USD 431

Bourbon County
 Fort Scott High School, Fort Scott, USD 234
 Uniontown High School, Uniontown, USD 235
 Christian Learning Center, Fort Scott, Private
 Fort Scott Christian Heights, Fort Scott, Private

Brown County
 Hiawatha High School, Hiawatha, USD 415
 Horton High School, Horton, USD 430
 Kickapoo Nation School, Powhattan, Private

Butler County

 Andover Central High School, USD 385
 Andover High School, USD 385
 Augusta High School, Augusta, USD 402
 Bluestem High School, Leon, USD 205
 Circle High School, Towanda, USD 375
 Douglass High School, Douglass, USD 396
 El Dorado High School, El Dorado, USD 490
 Flinthills High School, Rosalia, USD 492
 Frederic Remington High School, Whitewater, USD 206
 Rose Hill High School, Rose Hill, USD 394
 Berean Academy, Elbing, Private

Chase County
 Chase County Junior/Senior High School, Cottonwood Falls, USD 284

Chautauqua County
 Cedar Vale High School, Cedar Vale, USD 285
 Sedan High School, Sedan, USD 286

Cherokee County
 Baxter Springs High School, Baxter Springs, USD 508
 Columbus High School, Columbus, USD 493
 Galena High School, Galena, USD 499
 Riverton High School, Riverton, USD 404

Cheyenne County
 Cheylin West Junior/Senior High School, Bird City, USD 103
 St. Francis High School, St. Francis, USD 297

Clark County
 Ashland High School, Ashland, USD 220
 Minneola High School, Minneola, USD 219

Clay County
 Clay Center Community High School, Clay Center, USD 379
 Wakefield High School, Wakefield, USD 379

Cloud County
 Clifton-Clyde Senior High School, Clyde, USD 224
 Concordia Junior-Senior High School, Concordia, USD 333
 Glasco High School, Glasco, USD 334
 Miltonvale High School, Miltonvale, USD 334

Coffey County
 Lebo Junior-Senior High School, Lebo, USD 243
 Waverly High School, Waverly, USD 243
 Burlington High School, Burlington, USD 244
 Southern Coffey County High School, LeRoy, USD 245

Comanche County
 South Central High School, Coldwater, USD 300

Cowley County

 Arkansas City High School, Arkansas City, USD 470
 Central Junior-Senior High School, Burden, USD 462
 Dexter High School, Dexter, USD 471
 Udall High School, Udall, USD 463
 Winfield High School, Winfield, USD 465

Crawford County

 Frontenac Junior/Senior High School, Frontenac, USD 249
 Girard High School, Girard, USD 248
 Northeast High School, Arma, USD 246
 Southeast High School, Cherokee, USD 247
 Pittsburg High School, Pittsburg, USD 250
 St. Mary's-Colgan High School, Pittsburg, Private

Decatur County
 Decatur Community Junior/Senior High School, Oberlin, USD 294

Dickinson County

 Abilene High School, Abilene, USD 435
 Chapman High School, Chapman, USD 473
 Herington High School, Herington, USD 487
 Hope High School, Hope, USD 481
 Solomon High School, Solomon, USD 393
 Abilene Baptist Academy, Abilene, Private

Doniphan County
 Doniphan West High School, Highland (formerly Midway and Highland High Schools)
 Troy High School, Troy
 Riverside High School, Wathena (Merger of Wathena and Elwood)

Douglas County

 Baldwin High School, Baldwin City, USD 348
 Eudora High School, Eudora, USD 491
 Lawrence Free State High School, Lawrence, USD 497
 Lawrence High School, Lawrence, USD 497
 Bishop Seabury Academy, Lawrence, Private
 Veritas Christian School, Lawrence, Private

Edwards County
 Kinsley Junior-Senior High School, Kinsley

Elk County
 Elk Valley High School, Longton, USD 283
 West Elk High School, Howard, USD 282

Ellis County
 Ellis High School, Ellis, USD 388
 Hays High School, Hays, USD 489
 Victoria High School, Victoria, USD 432
 Thomas More Prep-Marian, Hays, Private

Ellsworth County
 Ellsworth High School, Ellsworth, USD 327
 Wilson High School, Wilson, USD 112

Finney County
 Garden City High School, Garden City, USD 457
 Holcomb High School, Holcomb, USD 363

Ford County
 Bucklin High School, Bucklin, USD 459
 Dodge City High School, Dodge City, USD 443
 Spearville Junior/Senior High School, Spearville, USD 381

Franklin County
 Central Heights High School, Richmond, USD 288
 Ottawa High School, Ottawa, USD 290
 Wellsville High School, Wellsville, USD 289
 West Franklin High School, Pomona, USD 287 (consolidation of Pomona and Williamsburg High Schools)

Geary County
 Junction City High School, Junction City, USD 475
 St. Xavier High School, Junction City, Private

Gove County
 Quinter Junior-Senior High School, Quinter, USD 293
 Wheatland High School, Grainfield, USD 291

Graham County
 Hill City High School, Hill City, USD 281

Grant County
 Ulysses High School, Ulysses, USD 214

Gray County
 Cimarron High School, Cimarron, USD 102
 Ingalls High School, Ingalls, USD 477
 South Gray High School, Montezuma, USD 371

Greeley County
 Greeley County High School, Tribune, USD 200

Greenwood County
 Eureka High School, Eureka, USD 389
 Hamilton High School, Hamilton, USD 390
 Madison High School, Madison, USD 386

Hamilton County
 Syracuse High School, Syracuse, USD 494

Harper County
 Attica High School, Attica, USD 511
 Chaparral High School, Anthony, USD 361

Harvey County

 Burrton High School, Burrton, USD 369
 Halstead High School, Halstead, USD 440
 Hesston High School, Hesston, USD 460
 Newton High School, Newton, USD 373
 Sedgwick High School, Sedgwick, USD 439

Haskell County
 Satanta Junior-Senior High School, Satanta, USD 507
 Sublette High School, Sublette, USD 374

Hodgeman County
 Hodgeman County High School, Jetmore, USD 227

Jackson County
 Royal Valley High School, Hoyt, USD 337
 Holton High School, Holton, USD 336
 Jackson Heights High School, Holton, USD 335

Jefferson County

 Jefferson County North High School, Winchester, USD 339
 Jefferson West High School, Meriden, USD 340
 McLouth High School, McLouth, USD 342
 Oskaloosa High School, Oskaloosa, USD 341
 Perry-Lecompton High School, Perry, USD 343
 Valley Falls High School, Valley Falls, USD 338

Jewell County
 Rock Hills High School, Mankato, USD 107

Johnson County

 Gardner Edgerton High School, Gardner, USD 231
 De Soto High School, De Soto, USD232
 Mill Valley High School, Shawnee, USD 232
 Bishop Miege High School, Roeland Park, Private
 Kansas City Christian School, Prairie Village, Private
 Shawnee Mission Christian School, Westwood, Private
 Christ Preparatory Academy, Lenexa, Private
 St. James Academy, Lenexa, Private
 Maranatha Christian Academy, Shawnee, Private
 Midland Adventist Academy, Shawnee, Private

Olathe

 Olathe East High School, Olathe, USD 233
 Olathe North High School, Olathe, USD 233
 Olathe Northwest High School, Olathe, USD 233
 Olathe South High School, Olathe, USD 233
 Olathe West High School, Olathe, USD 233
 Kansas State School For the Deaf, Olathe, Private

Overland Park

USD 229

 Blue Valley High School, Overland Park, USD 229
 Blue Valley North High School, Overland Park, USD 229
 Blue Valley Northwest High School, Overland Park, USD 229
 Blue Valley West High School, Overland Park, USD 229
 Blue Valley Southwest High School, Overland Park, USD 229
 Blue Valley Academy, Overland Park, USD 229

USD 512

 Shawnee Mission East High School, Prairie Village, USD 512
 Shawnee Mission North High School, Overland Park, USD 512
 Shawnee Mission Northwest High School, Shawnee, USD 512
 Shawnee Mission South High School, Overland Park, USD 512
 Shawnee Mission West High School, Overland Park, USD 512
 Horizons High School, ?, USD 512

Private

 Hyman Brand Hebrew Academy, Overland Park, Private
 Overland Christian Schools, Overland Park, Private
 St. Thomas Aquinas High School, Overland Park, Private

Kearny County
 Deerfield High School, Deerfield, USD 216
 Lakin High School, Lakin, USD 215

Kingman County
 Cunningham High School, Cunningham, USD 332
 Kingman High School, Kingman, USD 331
 Norwich High School, Norwich, USD 331

Kiowa County
 Kiowa County High School, Greensburg, USD 422

Labette County
 Chetopa High School, Chetopa, USD 505
 Labette County High School, Altamont, USD 506
 Oswego Junior-Senior High School, Oswego, USD 504
 Parsons Senior High School, Parsons, USD 503

Lane County
 Dighton High School, Dighton, USD 482
 Healy High School, Healy, USD 468

Leavenworth County

 Basehor-Linwood High School, Basehor, USD 458
 Lansing High School, Lansing, USD 469
 Leavenworth High School, Leavenworth, USD 453
 Pleasant Ridge High School, Easton, USD 449
 Tonganoxie High School, Tonganoxie, USD 464

Lincoln County
 Lincoln Junior/Senior High School, Lincoln, USD 298
 Sylvan Unified High School, Sylvan Grove, USD 299

Linn County
 Jayhawk-Linn High School, Mound City, USD 346
 Pleasanton High School, Pleasanton, USD 344
 Prairie View High School, La Cygne, USD 362

Logan County
 Oakley High School, Oakley, USD 274
 Triplains High School, Winona, USD 275

Lyon County
 Emporia High School, Emporia, USD 253
 Northern Heights High School, Allen, USD 251
 Hartford High School, Hartford, USD 252
 Olpe Junior-Senior High School, Olpe, USD 252

Marion County

 Centre High School, Lost Springs, USD 397
 Goessel High School, Goessel, USD 411
 Hillsboro High School, Hillsboro, USD 410
 Marion High School, Marion, USD 408
 Peabody-Burns Junior/Senior High School, Peabody, USD 398

Marshall County
 Frankfort High School, Frankfort, USD 380
 Marysville Junior/Senior High School, Marysville, USD 364
 Valley Heights Jr/Sr High School, Blue Rapids, USD 498

McPherson County

 Canton-Galva High School, Canton, USD 419
 Inman Junior/Senior High School, Inman, USD 448
 Moundridge High School, Moundridge, USD 423
 Smoky Valley High School, Lindsborg, USD 400
 McPherson High School, McPherson, USD 418
 Elyria Christian School, McPherson, Private

Meade County
 Fowler High School, Fowler, USD 225
 Meade High School, Meade, USD 226

Miami County
 Louisburg High School, Louisburg, USD 416
 Osawatomie High School, Osawatomie, USD 367
 Paola High School, Paola, USD 368
 Spring Hill High School, Spring Hill, USD 230

Mitchell County
 Beloit Junior-Senior High School, Beloit, USD 273
 St. John's Catholic High School, Beloit, Private
 Tipton Catholic High School, Tipton, Private

Montgomery County

 Caney Valley High School, Caney, USD 436
 Cherryvale Middle-High School, Cherryvale, USD 447
 Field Kindley High School, Coffeyville, USD 445
 Independence High School, Independence, USD 446
 Tyro Community Christian School, Tyro, Private
 Independence Bible School, Independence, Private

Morris County
 Council Grove High School, Council Grove, USD 417
 White City High School, White City, USD 481

Morton County
 Elkhart High School, Elkhart, USD 218
 Rolla High School, Rolla, USD 217

Nemaha County

 Centralia High School, Centralia, USD 380
 Nemaha Central High School, Seneca, USD 115
 Axtell High School, Axtell, USD 113
 Sabetha High School, Sabetha, USD 113
 Wetmore Academic Center, Wetmore,USD 113

Neosho County
 Chanute High School, Chanute, USD 413
 Erie High School, Erie, USD 101
 St. Paul High School, St. Paul, USD 505

Ness County
 Ness City High School, Ness City, USD 303
 Western Plains High School, Ransom, USD 106

Norton County
 Northern Valley High School, Almena, USD 212
 Norton High School, Norton, USD 211

Osage County

 Burlingame High School, Burlingame, USD 454
 Lyndon High School, Lyndon, USD 421
 Marais des Cygnes Valley High School, Melvern, USD 456
 Osage City High School, Osage City, USD 420
 Santa Fe Trail High School, Carbondale, USD 434

Osborne County
 Lakeside High School, Downs, USD 272
 Natoma High School, Natoma, USD 399
 Osborne High School, Osborne, USD 392

Ottawa County
 Minneapolis High School, Minneapolis, USD 239
 Bennington High School, Bennington, USD 240
 Tescott High School, Tescott, USD 240

Pawnee County
 Larned High School, Larned, USD 495
 Pawnee Heights High School, Rozel, USD 496

Phillips County
 Logan High School, Logan, USD 326
 Phillipsburg High School, Phillipsburg, USD 325

Pottawatomie County
 Rock Creek Junior/Senior High School, St. George, USD 323
 Onaga Senior High School, Onaga, USD 322
 St. Marys High School, St. Marys, USD 321
 Wamego High School, Wamego, USD 320

Pratt County
 Pratt High School, Pratt, USD 382
 Skyline High School, Pratt, USD 438

Rawlins County
 Rawlins County High School, Atwood, USD 105

Reno County

 Buhler High School, Buhler, USD 313
 Fairfield High School, Langdon, USD 310
 Haven High School, Haven, USD 312
 Hutchinson High School, Hutchinson, USD 308
 Nickerson High School, Nickerson, USD 309
 Pretty Prairie High School, Pretty Prairie, USD 311
 Central Christian School, Hutchinson, Private
 Trinity Catholic High School, Hutchinson, Private

Republic County
 Republic County High School, Belleville, USD 109
 Pike Valley High School, Scandia, USD 426

Rice County

 Chase High School, Chase, USD 401
 Little River High School, Little River, USD 444
 Lyons High School, Lyons, USD 405
 Sterling High School, Sterling, USD 376

Riley County
 Blue Valley High School, Randolph, USD 384
 Manhattan High School West/East Campus, Manhattan, USD 383
 Riley County High School, Riley, USD 378

Rooks County
 Palco High School, Palco, USD 269
 Plainville High School, Plainville, USD 270
 Stockton High School, Stockton, USD 271

Rush County
 Lacrosse High School, Lacrosse, USD 395
 Otis-Bison High School, Otis, USD 403

Russell County
 Russell High School, Russell, USD 407

Saline County

 Ell-Saline High School, Brookville, USD 307
 Salina High School Central, Salina, USD 305
 Salina High School South, Salina, USD 305
 Southeast of Saline High School, Gypsum, USD 306
 Sacred Heart High School, Saline, Private
 St. John's Military School, Salina, Private

Scott County
 Scott Community High School, Scott City, USD 466

Sedgwick County

 Cheney High School, Cheney, USD 268
 Clearwater High School, Clearwater, USD 264
 Derby High School, Derby, USD 260
 Valley Center High School, Valley Center, USD 262
 Wichita Northeast Magnet High School, Bel Aire, USD 259
 Eisenhower High School, Goddard, USD 265 
 Goddard High School, Goddard, USD 265 
 Maize High School, Maize, USD 266
 Maize South High School, Maize, USD 266
 Andale High School, Andale, USD 267
 Garden Plain High School, Garden Plain, USD 267
 Sunrise Christian Academy, Bel Aire, Private

Wichita

Public

 Wichita East High School, Wichita, USD 259
 Wichita Heights High School, Wichita, USD 259
 Wichita North High School, Wichita, USD 259
 Wichita Northwest High School, Wichita, USD 259
 Wichita South High School, Wichita, USD 259
 Wichita Southeast High School, Wichita, USD 259
 Wichita West High School, Wichita, USD 259
 Chester I. Lewis Academic Learning Center, Wichita, USD 259
 Sowers Alternative High School, Wichita, USD 259
 Campus High School, Wichita, USD 261

Private

 Annoor Islamic School, Wichita, Private
 Bishop Carroll Catholic High School, Wichita, Private
 Classical School of Wichita, Wichita, Private
 The Independent School, Wichita, Private
 Kapaun Mt. Carmel High School, Wichita, Private
 Life Preparatory Academy, Wichita, Private
 Trinity Academy, Wichita, Private
 Wichita Adventist Christian Academy, Wichita, Private
 Wichita Collegiate School, Wichita, Private

Seward County
 Liberal High School, Liberal, USD 480
 Southwestern Heights Junior/Senior High School, Kismet, USD 483

Shawnee County

 Rossville High School, Rossville, USD 321
 Shawnee Heights High School, Tecumseh, USD 450
 Silver Lake Junior-Senior High School, Silver Lake, USD 372

Topeka

Public

 Seaman High School, Topeka, USD 345
 Washburn Rural High School, Topeka, USD 437
 Highland Park High School, Topeka, USD 501
 Hope Street Academy, Topeka, USD 501
 Topeka High School, Topeka, USD 501
 Topeka West High School, Topeka, USD 501

Private

 Cair Paravel-Latin School, Topeka, Private
 Hayden High School, Topeka, Private
 Heritage Christian School, Topeka, Private

Sheridan County
 Hoxie High School, Hoxie, USD 412

Sherman County
 Goodland High School, Goodland, USD 352

Smith County
 Smith Center High School, Smith Center, USD 237
 Thunder Ridge High School, Kensington, USD 110

Stafford County
 Macksville High School, Macksville, USD 351
 St. John-Hudson High School, St. John, USD 350
 Stafford Middle/High School, Stafford, USD 349

Stanton County
 Stanton County High School, Johnson, USD 452

Stevens County
 Hugoton High School, Hugoton, USD 210
 Moscow High School, Moscow, USD 209

Sumner County

 Argonia High School, Argonia, USD 359
 Belle Plaine High School, Belle Plaine, USD 357
 Caldwell High School, Caldwell, USD 360
 Conway Springs High School, Conway Springs, USD 356
 Oxford Junior/Senior High School, Oxford, USD 358
 Mulvane High School, Mulvane, USD 263
 South Haven High School, South Haven, USD 509
 Wellington High School, Wellington, USD 353

Thomas County
 Brewster High School, Brewster, USD 314
 Colby High School, Colby, USD 315
 Golden Plains High School, Rexford, USD 316

Trego County
 Trego Community High School, Wakeeney, USD 208

Wabaunsee County
 Mission Valley High School, Eskridge, USD 330
 Wabaunsee High School, Alma, USD 329

Wallace County
 Wallace County High School, Sharon Springs, USD 241
 Weskan High School, Weskan, USD 242

Washington County
 Washington County High School, Washington, USD 108
 Hanover High School, Hanover, USD 223
 Linn High School, Linn, USD 223

Wichita County
 Wichita County High School, Leoti, USD 467

Wilson County
 Altoona-Midway High School, Buffalo, USD 387
 Fredonia High School, Fredonia, USD 484
 Neodesha High School, Neodesha, USD 461

Woodson County
 Yates Center High School, Yates Center, USD 366

Wyandotte County

 Bonner Springs High School, Bonner Springs, USD 204
 Piper High School, Piper, USD 203

Kansas City

Public

 Turner High School, Kansas City, USD 202
 J. C. Harmon High School, Kansas City, USD 500
 F. L. Schlagle High School, Kansas City, USD 500
 Sumner Academy of Arts and Science, Kansas City, USD 500
 Washington High School, Kansas City, USD 500
 Wyandotte High School, Kansas City, USD 500

Private

 Bishop Ward High School, Kansas City, Private
 Kansas State School for the Blind (KSSB), Kansas City, Private

See also

 Kansas State Department of Education
 Kansas State High School Activities Association
 List of unified school districts in Kansas
 List of colleges and universities in Kansas
 List of defunct colleges and universities in Kansas
 Education in Kansas

External links
 List of high schools in Kansas from SchoolTree.org
State
 Kansas State Department Of Education, KSDE
 Kansas State High School Activities Association, KSHSAA
Consolidations
 School consolidations in Kansas for past decade; Topeka-Capital Journal; July 24, 2011.
Maps
 Kansas School District - Boundary Map, KSDE

Kansas
High